Lillipilly Hill (1960) is a novel for children by Australian author Eleanor Spence.  It was commended for the Children's Book of the Year Award: Older Readers in 1961.

Story outline
The novel follows the story of Harriet Wilmot and her family who go to live in a house in the NSW town of Barley Creek at the end of the nineteenth-century.  They had previously lived in London and had inherited the house from a relative.

Harriot is very accepting of the new country though the rest of her family struggles with the heat and isolation. The book is a coming of age story, not just for Harriet but for her brother Aidan and for the rest of the family as well.

Critical reception
Reviewing the Text Publishing release for Readings Alexa Dretzke was very happy to see the book re-issued and noted: "Lillipilly Hill is still a compelling read and the characters are well developed. Though the odd word may be a little dated, girls who have loved the Our Australian Girl series will find plenty to enjoy here."

Notes
Text Publishing re-issued the novel in 2013 as a part of their "Text Classics" series, with an introduction by Ursula Dubosarsky.

Awards
 1961 – commended Children's Book of the Year Award: Older Readers

See also
 1960 in Australian literature

References

External links
"Something Shining" by Ursula Dubosarsky in Issimo Magazine. Retrieved 6 November, 2016. 

Australian children's novels
1960 novels
Children's historical novels
Novels set in New South Wales
1960 children's books